Lockheed is a fictional character appearing in American comic books published by Marvel Comics. The character appears most commonly in association with the X-Men. He is an alien dragon and longtime companion of Shadowcat (Kitty Pryde), a member of the X-Men and Excalibur.

Lockheed makes sporadic minor appearances in X-Men related animated television series and made his live-action debut in the 2020 film The New Mutants.

Publication history

Lockheed was created by writer Chris Claremont and artist Paul Smith and first appeared in Uncanny X-Men #166 (February 1983).

Fictional character biography
In The Uncanny X-Men # 153, "Kitty's Fairy Tale", Kitty Pryde, the teenage member of the X-Men, tells a bedtime story to young Illyana Rasputin, who was living with the X-Men at the time. The story recasts the X-Men, including the recently deceased Jean Grey, in the roles of fairy tale characters. One such character was a giant black dragon named "Lockheed", who was based on the X-Men's modified Lockheed SR-71 Blackbird jet aircraft.

Not long afterward, the X-Men are captured by the alien race, the Brood, and taken to a Brood-colonized planet. Here, Kitty meets a cat-sized purple dragon who resembles the creature from her fairy tale, which she also names "Lockheed". Lockheed is actually a member of a highly advanced dragon-like extraterrestrial race, who are capable of traveling through space via special astral ships which transport their essences. Their society is similar to insect hives, with the individual being only part of the "Flock". Lockheed had been celebrated by his people as a brave fighter and hero against the Brood, but had demonstrated individual attitudes and wishes which were realized only when he encountered the X-Men.

Lockheed saves Kitty from the Brood, and then secretly departs along with her. She, as well as Professor X and her teammates, are unaware of his presence in the X-Mansion until he again saves Kitty's life from a nest of alien Sidrian hunter hatchlings. The X-Men accept his presence, and Lockheed has since become Kitty's longtime companion.

To a lesser degree, Lockheed also bonds with Illyana Rasputin, who, after being abducted into the dimension of Limbo (also known as Otherplace) by the sorcerer Belasco, had aged into a teenager, manifested her own mutant powers, and been installed as Kitty's roommate.  Lockheed occasionally accompanies Illyana after she joins the X-Men's "junior team", the New Mutants, including an adventure where the two encounter Brood-controlled clones of the X-Men.

Secret Wars
During the Secret Wars the X-Men, including Lockheed, are transported to an alien planet nicknamed "Battleworld". There Lockheed meets a green, female alien dragon, supposedly created by the Beyonder's lingering power. This second dragon accompanied Lockheed and his allies to Earth, but she grew to gigantic size upon arrival and rampaged across Tokyo. She seemingly vanished from existence when Lockheed rejected her, though she eventually resurfaced. In the companion series Spider-Man and the Secret Wars, it is shown that Lockheed spent some time patrolling Denver, Colorado, which had been taken to Battleworld as well, protecting its citizens from alien attack.

Excalibur
In addition to serving with the X-Men alongside Kitty, he joins her when she co-founds the British superhero team Excalibur. There he would form a friendship with Widget.

Lockheed participates in the so-called Cross-Time Caper, which involves him and his teammates leaping through dimensions on a train. The train itself is from an alternate universe, and it is discovered that its power source is an alternate version of Lockheed himself. The two Lockheeds become good friends, although the other Lockheed desires to stay on the train. Lockheed travels with the team (and their ally, Alistaire Stuart) on several adventures throughout multiple realities. The team also encounters a humanoid version of Lockheed. He and a female Nightcrawler analogue together adopt the identity of Captain Britain, protecting the citizens of a magic-heavy planet. Near the end of the Caper, Lockheed and the team believe Kitty to be lost in the dimensions; in reality she had been transported home far earlier than the rest of the group. The intervention of the vastly powerful Saturnyne allows the team to return home.

Eventually, Lockheed's decision to leave with Kitty and the X-Men comes back to haunt him. By leaving so unexpectedly, he had abandoned his fiancée, whom he had been due to wed the following day. While healing from injuries gained from fighting Doctor Doom, his astral form is apprehended by the Flock and made to stand trial for treason. After managing to explain his motives and saving his fellows from a piloting accident, he is officially exiled from his race, but on amicable terms.

Lockheed's affections for Kitty earn him the ire of interdimensional entities called Bamfs, characters from the fairy tale Kitty once told Illyana. Like Lockheed, these were real as well. These small versions of Nightcrawler also love Kitty, in their own way. At one point, jealous of Lockheed's relationship with Kitty, they invade the tunnels under Muir Island and hold him prisoner for some time. Lockheed's penchant for hiding after Kitty moves did not help his situation, as Kitty simply thought he was again being difficult.

Lockheed develops a severe distaste for the secret agent Pete Wisdom, Kitty's love interest. Lockheed demonstrates that he has the ability to speak, but only talks to Wisdom, telling him that he "hates him". Wisdom tells Kitty about this, but she believes he is only joking, and he suffers the frequent theft of his clothing and cigarettes. Even so, Lockheed does save Wisdom's life at one point, although he tells the Londoner "I still 'ate yoo". It appears that one reason Lockheed dislikes Wisdom so much is that he much prefers Kitty's previous boyfriend, Colossus. This is demonstrated at the wedding of Captain Britain and Meggan, when Lockheed attempts to help them reconnect by snatching the bride's garter and dropping it into Piotr's hands just after Kitty had won Meggan's bouquet.

Later, after Kitty left Excalibur and the X-Men entirely, it is believed that Lockheed had died. In reality, Lockheed had been found, wounded and confused, by a pair of girls who practiced witchcraft. He bonds with them until he discovers that the girls use their abilities to terrorize the local populace. The duo were soon humiliated in battle by their rival, another young girl with powers. This new friend heals Lockheed and directs him back to Kitty.

Back on the X-Men
Kitty eventually rejoins the X-Men and Lockheed happily follows. When the X-Men battle the alien Ord, Lockheed saves the day with his fire breath.

Lockheed becomes part of a training exercise for the younger students at Xavier's institute. He was the "flag" in a game of Capture the Flag, hiding in the middle of the hedge maze. This created problems because many of the students found it hard to actually believe in a living, miniature dragon; the mutant Wither ended up endangering Lockheed with his organic-destruction powers.

Lockheed attempts to help the X-Men stop the Hulk in World War Hulk, but was defeated with the rest of the team.

Agent of S.W.O.R.D.
It is revealed that Lockheed is a mole within the Institute for S.W.O.R.D. Abigail Brand, S.W.O.R.D.'s Director later told Kitty to stop coddling the dragon like a "starlet's chihuahua", that he was an informant in exchange for S.W.O.R.D.'s help with pressing issues on his homeworld, and that he could speak more languages than the X-Men's resident genius, the Beast. The shocked team looked on as Lockheed flew away from Kitty. The X-Men then join forces with S.W.O.R.D. in an attempt to end the confrontation with the alien race of Breakworld, who are attempting to destroy Earth with a giant missile. Kitty is assigned with the team appointed to stop the missile, while Lockheed is forced to remain behind. The two share a final lingering look before Kitty leaves. It is revealed that the missile is actually a giant bullet, and Kitty becomes trapped in it phasing it through the Earth. While grieving over Kitty, Lockheed drinks heavily to help with the pain. Eventually Abigail Brand reveals that Kitty is still alive within the bullet but they can't get her out yet. Lockheed then approaches a villain named Unit for help, but after learning that he would have to free Unit from prison changes his mind and leaves.

Kitty and Lockheed reunite in Astonishing X-Men (vol. 3) #38. He has since joined her at the Jean Grey School for Higher Learning. A brochure included at the end of Wolverine and the X-Men #1 states that he teaches a class entitled "Knowing Your Alien Races, And How To Kill Them".

Lockjaw and the Pet Avengers
In the mini-series Lockjaw and the Pet Avengers, Lockheed teams up with Lockjaw (the teleporting bulldog from the Inhumans), Redwing (the Falcon's pet falcon), Zabu (Ka-Zar's sabretooth tiger companion and ally), Niels the Cat/Hairball (who gained the same powers as Speedball during the same incident), a frog Thor, and Ms. Lion (May Parker's pet dog from Spider-Man and his Amazing Friends) on a quest for the Infinity Gems. He expresses great grief over the loss of Kitty, and his estrangement from his homeworld. In another instance, he expresses feelings of guilt over acting as a mole for S.W.O.R.D, stating that he had already "betrayed too many friends and allies in the past". Lockheed is given the Time Gem during this adventure.

X-Men Gold 
Lockheed attends Kitty's wedding rehearsal dinner, bringing along his dragon family.

Powers and abilities
Lockheed looks like a small European dragon about the size of a cat. He has purple skin, sharp claws and teeth, two small, curved horns protruding from the back of his head, and wings that enable him to fly. He can breathe extremely intense fire and is a surprisingly formidable combatant for his size, having once destroyed a nest of Sidri hatchlings and at another time bested a fully armored medieval knight-in-training. The Brood that he confronted upon his first appearance were terrified and immediately fled upon seeing him. His brain is immune to telepathic probing by telepaths such as Professor X. He is empathic, able to understand human speech, and although he rarely does so is able to speak English as well.

Reception
 In 2014, Entertainment Weekly ranked Lockheed 68th in their "Let's rank every X-Man ever" list.
 In 2021, CBR.com ranked Lockheed 3rd in their "10 Smartest Marvel Sidekicks" list.
 In 2022, Newsarama ranked Lockheed 9th in their "Best superhero sidekicks of all time" list.

Character evolution
Lockheed's appearance and character, as depicted by the various artists who illustrated him and writer Chris Claremont, evolved from the time of his first appearance to his later appearances in Excalibur. When he first appeared as drawn by Paul Smith, he was largely quadrupedal, with red eyes lacking any pupils or irises, a small triangular head about half a foot long, and teeth protruding outward from his upper and lower jaws, and his intelligence appeared comparable with that of a dog. By the time of his appearances in Excalibur as drawn by Alan Davis, he had been anthropomorphized considerably. His eyes were now human-like, with white corneas and black irises, though at times they were colored yellow and red or orange and he was capable of more human-like facial expressions and gestures, including standing on his hind legs. His teeth no longer stuck out of the sides of his mouth, his head was more oblong and his jaw was much longer.

Recently, Lockheed has reverted more to his previous appearance. He no longer stands on his hind legs and his eyes are once again without pupils. He still retains the same personality and skills. Initially, his only vocalizations included mostly animal-like sounds like cooing or roars, but hints were dropped as early as The Uncanny X-Men #168 that he was capable of more articulate words like "oops" and was shown as capable of speaking some words of English years later in Fantastic Four Versus the X-Men #4 (June 1987) and Excalibur #64 (April 1993).

During his tenure on Excalibur, Warren Ellis left no uncertainty about Lockheed's intelligence: he is capable of conversant speech (although for some reason he speaks in a Cockney accent, despite spending most of his life in America and Scotland); however, the only member of Excalibur who ever hears him is Kitty's boyfriend Peter Wisdom, whom Lockheed dislikes. Pete tries to convince the other members that Lockheed can talk, but, in one of the repeated gags of Ellis' run, they refuse to believe him. Even in his times of muteness, he appears to understand what is said and done around him. While Lockheed sometimes tries to give the impression of being unintelligent, at other times he demonstrates outstanding powers of deduction, awareness and intelligence. He is very loyal to Kitty and shares a close rapport with her that is possibly psychic in nature. In Astonishing X-Men an alien telepath confirmed this by saying that Lockheed and Kitty were deeply connected and that the dragon could locate her through that bond. Later in the series, it is revealed that he can speak many languages, some presumably alien.

Other versions

X-Babies
In the series of X-Babies specials in the 1990s, the title characters gain an ally in "Locksteed", a version of Lockheed large enough to carry several X-Babies on his back. Apart from his larger size, Locksteed differs from Lockheed mainly in configuration, Locksteed's body design being closer to a quadrupedal riding animal's shape with larger, stronger forelegs.

Earth-1289
Lockheed is the humanoid counterpart of Kitty's pet dragon; he and Kymri jointly took on the mantle of Captain Britain after they emerged victorious in a tournament in Excalibur #16–17. His status in regard to membership in the Captain Britain Corps is unknown, since he was not chosen by Merlyn or Roma.

Mutant X
In this reality Lockheed joins the Starjammers, which consists of Cyclops, Binary, Nova, and Silver Surfer.

Secret Wars
During the 2015 Secret Wars storyline, a version of Lockheed named Lock resides in the wuxia-inspired K'un-L'un region of Battleworld. In this continuity, Lock resembles a small Chinese dragon and is a member of Callisto's band of outcasts along with Kitten, a version of Kitty. Lock and the other outcasts become pupils of Shang-Chi, the exiled son of Emperor Zheng Zu, who names their new school The Lowest Caste. Shang-Chi represents the school for the tournament deciding the next Emperor of K'un-L'un and emerges victorious, replacing his father as the new Emperor and sparing Lock and the Lowest Caste from death.

In other media

Television
 Lockheed appears in X-Men: Pryde of the X-Men, voiced by Frank Welker. This version is initially an inhabitant of Asteroid M before escaping with the X-Men.
 Lockheed appears in The Super Hero Squad Show episode "Mysterious Mayhem at Mutant Academy!".

Film
Lockheed appears in The New Mutants. This version is a companion to Illyana Rasputin / Magik, who carries a small purple hand puppet version of Lockheed while the real one exists in Limbo until he is summoned to aid her.

Video games
 Lockheed appears as an assist character in Marvel: Avengers Alliance.
 Lockheed appears as an unlockable assist character in Marvel Puzzle Quest.
 Lockheed appears as an unlockable upgrade for Shadowcat in Uncanny X-Men: The Days of Future Past.
 Lockheed appears as a non-playable character in Marvel Heroes.
 Lockheed appears in Marvel Strike Force.

Novels
Lockheed appears in the novelization for X-Men: The Last Stand.

Footnotes

External links
 
 UncannyXmen.net Spotlight on Lockheed

Comics characters introduced in 1983
Fictional dragons
Animal superheroes
Marvel Comics sidekicks
Marvel Comics aliens
Marvel Comics extraterrestrial superheroes
Marvel Comics male superheroes
Fictional characters with fire or heat abilities
Fictional empaths
Fictional secret agents and spies
Characters created by Chris Claremont
X-Men members
Excalibur (comics)